Heinz Laufer (23 May 1925 – 26 March 2010) was a German middle-distance runner. He competed in the men's 3000 metres steeplechase at the 1956 Summer Olympics.

References

1925 births
2010 deaths
Athletes (track and field) at the 1956 Summer Olympics
German male middle-distance runners
German male steeplechase runners
Olympic athletes of the United Team of Germany
Place of birth missing